The Military Band Service of the Armed Forces of the Republic of Azerbaijan is the official military band service of the Azerbaijani Armed Forces. It is part of the command structure of the Ministry of Defense of Azerbaijan.

History of Azerbaijani military bands 
In the early days of the establishment of the Azerbaijani National Army of the Azerbaijan Democratic Republic, a military band was created in a short period of time. The first military parade in Baku in 1919 was accompanied by a military band. Military bands have always existed in the history of the Azerbaijan Soviet Socialist Republic. During Yusif Akhundzade's service as director of the school band of the Caspian Higher Naval School (later known as the Azerbaijan Higher Naval Academy), it participated in the 1971 and 1983 October Revolution Day Parade on Moscow's Red Square. In 1971, the band's performance on Kutuzovsky Prospekt featured the famous Azeri march Vatan by composer Alimardan Aliyev, which was one of the few times oriental music was played at a military parade in Moscow. A band was also maintained in the Baku Higher Combined Arms Command School.

Foundation of the service 
On the basis of the bands of the Baku Garrison, Transcaucasian Military District of the Soviet Armed Forces, the military band service was founded on 1 July 1992 by order of the Minister of Defense Rahim Gaziyev. The debut performance of the units of the band service was on 9 October 1992 during the Day of the Armed Forces parade on Azadliq Square. Being a young unit, it needed to get specially designed uniforms for the parade. This was the result of having to wear military uniforms left over from the Soviet Army. During preparations for the state visit of President of Turkey Turgut Özal, the military attache of the Turkish embassy in Baku entered the band training hall, to which he was disappointed in the uniforms of musicians, with the Turkish Army sending parade uniforms and musical instruments sometime later.

President Heydar Aliyev supervised the training of national cadres in the band and the training of military music specialists. In the first years of the formation of the service, the soloists of the exemplary band took part in the farewell ceremonies of the personnel going to the battle in the First Nagorno-Karabakh War. In the 90s, military bands in the Land Forces, Air Force and Navy, as well as special educational institutions were created.

Composition 

The MBS of the Armed Forces is composed of the following bands:

 Exemplary Band of the Ministry of Defense of Azerbaijan
 Exemplary Band of the State Border Service of Azerbaijan
 Exemplary Band of the Internal Troops of Azerbaijan
 Headquarters bands of Military Garrisons
 Band of the Nakhchivan Garrison
 Band of the Ganja Garrison
 Cadet bands
 Band of the Azerbaijan Higher Military Academy
 Band of the Jamshid Nakhchivanski Military Lyceum
 Band of the Heydar Aliyev Military Lyceum

Specific bands

Exemplary Band of the Ministry of Defense
The Exemplary Band of the Ministry of Defense of Azerbaijan is the senior-most band in the armed forces. Being such, it serves as a type of presidential band, performing at all ceremonies involving the President of Azerbaijan. This includes state visits, opening ceremonies and base visits. Preparation for these events generally takes three to four days for the band. The President of Afghanistan Ashraf Ghani and Israeli Prime Minister Benjamin Netanyahu have given their own personal greetings to members of the band. It has also performed for dignitaries such as Russian President Vladimir Putin, Pope Francis and Iranian leader Hassan Rouhani. It has visited 50 countries. It is notable for organizing its performances without notes, but through memorization. In November 2019, soloists of the band represented Azerbaijan at the Katyusha Military-Music Festival in Moscow dedicated to the 75th anniversary of the victory in World War II.

It is the only military orchestra in the Commonwealth of Independent States to be led by a general.

Band of the Azerbaijan Higher Military Academy
The Band of the Azerbaijan Higher Military Academy is a 52-member military band that serves as part of the Azerbaijan Higher Military Academy (AAHA). The band was formed on 15 February 1992 and is one of the leading military ensembles in Azerbaijan. In August 2019, the academy military band, led by Colonel Ekhtibar Aliyev and Major Fariz Mamedzade, took part in the Spasskaya Tower Military Music Festival and Tattoo, representing Azerbaijan for the first time.

Band of the Internal Troops
The Band of the Internal Troops of Azerbaijan is the official military band of the Internal Troops. Currently, the band has 115 members and includes song and dance ensemble. On 17 November 1994, the General Directorate of Internal Troops of the Ministry of Internal Affairs ordered the establishment of the band. The current artistic director is Lieutenant Colonel Ilgar Novruzov, a graduate of the Baku Music Conservatory. He is also the author and composer of the anthem of the Internal Troops.

Band staffing
The training of military conductors is provided by a class at the Hajibeyov Baku Academy of Music, providing the basis for the development of military bands. There are also many civilians in Azeri military bands.

Performances and characteristics
In recent years, military bands have been performing in Baku on significant dates: Victory Day (9 May), Heydar Aliyev's birthday (10 May), and Republic Day (28 May).

The combined band of the service (usually 170-members) have taken part in the parades in honor of the 90th, 93rd, 95th, and 100th anniversary of the Azerbaijani Armed Forces as well as organized performances in various parts of Baku on the Day of the Armed Forces of Azerbaijan. In June 2017, the Band of the Defense Ministry performed with the Salamanca Band of the Rifles at the Azerbaijan State Philharmonic Hall. In September 2018, it performed for presidents Ilham Aliyev and Recep Tayyip Erdogan in honor of the 100th anniversary of the Liberation of Baku. At around the same time, a CD was released by the Exemplary Band that includes a number of military marches performed by the band and its soloists. In August 2019, the higher military academy band took part in the Spasskaya Tower Military Music Festival and Tattoo, representing Azerbaijan for the first time.

The band retains features from Russian and Turkish military bands in their repertoire and their marching style.

Uniform

Repertoire 
The service's repertoire includes modified pieces from famous Azerbaijani composers, including Said Rustamov and Emin Sabitoglu.The following marches are in the repertoire of the band:

 March "Vətən" (Alimərdan Aliyev)
 Azadlıq Marşı (Elchin Mirzabeyli)
 Qarşılama marşı (Həsənağa Abasquliyev)
 March "Sumgait" (Qulu Aliyev)
 March "Azərbaycan ordusu" (Eldar Mansurov)
 March "Sıravi Əhməd" (Emin Sabitoglu)
Qələbə Marşı (Rufat Akhundzade)

See also 
 Military Band Service of the Armed Forces of Russia

References

External links 
 Band of the State Border Service of Azerbaijan
 Band of the Azerbaijani Navy
 Band of the Azerbaijani Defense Ministry
 March "Vatan"
 Döyüşə gedirəm, Ana - Azərbaycan əsgəri
 Heyratı - Marşı ( DSX ORKESTR )
 Band of the Azerbaijani Military High School named after Heydar Aliyev
 Военный оркестр АР сыграл для Sputnik Азербайджан
 Marsh Ireli
 Saleh Bağırovla Antrakt - Müdafiə Nazirliyinin hərbi orkestri - 2018

Military of Azerbaijan
Military bands
Military units and formations established in 1992